Georgie Purcell is an Australian politician. She is a member of the Victorian Legislative Council representing Northern Victoria since November 2022. Purcell is a member of the Animal Justice Party.

References 

Living people
Members of the Victorian Legislative Council
21st-century Australian politicians
Animal Justice Party members of the Parliament of Victoria
Year of birth missing (living people)